Keith Forsyth (17 October 1917 – 20 February 2006) was an Australian rules footballer who played with Essendon in the Victorian Football League (VFL).

Notes

External links 
		

1917 births
2006 deaths
Australian rules footballers from Victoria (Australia)
Essendon Football Club players